2,2′-Bithiophene is the organic compound.   It is a colorless solid, although commercial samples are often greenish. It is the most common of the three isomers with formula (C4H3S)2. The other two isomers have the connectivity 2,3′- and 3,3′-.  The compound is typically prepared by cross-coupling starting from 2-halothiophenes.

X-ray crystallography shows that the two rings are coplanar, unlike the situation for biphenyl.

Occurrence
A number of bi- as well as terthiophenes exist naturally, invariably with substituents at the positions flanking sulfur.  In terms of the biosynthesis, bithiophenes are proposed to be derived from polyacetylenic precursors, which in turn are the products of dehydrogenation of oleic acid.  According to some hypotheses, these polyalkynes form labile 1,2-dithiins via a reaction with H2S2 or its equivalent.

References

Thiophenes